USS Lorain has been the name of multiple ships of the United States Navy ship, in honor of Lorain, Ohio.

  was canceled 12 March 1943, prior to the start of construction.
  was a yard tug that was named Lorain in civilian use prior to acquisition by the Navy on 19 October 1942.
 USS Lorain (APA-99) was a  renamed  in 1943 while under construction.
  was also a Tacoma-class patrol frigate, originally named , in commission from 1945 to 1946.

United States Navy ship names